The 2007 ITU Triathlon World Championships were held in Hamburg, Germany from 30 August to 2 September 2007.

Medal summary

References
ITU World Championships Results (Archived 2009-09-26)

World Triathlon Series
World Championships
Triathlon World Championships
Triathlon World Championships
International sports competitions hosted by Germany
Triathlon competitions in Germany
August 2007 sports events in Europe
September 2007 sports events in Europe
2000s in Hamburg